The Catoosa County School District is a public school district in Catoosa County, Georgia, United States, based in Ringgold, Georgia. It serves the communities of Fort Oglethorpe, Indian Springs, Lakeview, and Ringgold.

History

In 1954 the Ringgold Elementary School was destroyed in a fire.

Schools
The Catoosa County School District has ten elementary schools, three middle schools, and four high schools.

Elementary schools 
Battlefield Elementary School
Battlefield Primary School
Boynton Elementary School
Cloud Springs Elementary School
Graysville Elementary School
Ringgold Elementary School
Ringgold Primary School
Tiger Creek Elementary School
West Side Elementary School
Woodstation  Elementary School

Middle schools
Heritage Middle School
Lakeview Middle School
Ringgold Middle School

High schools
Heritage High School
Lakeview Fort Oglethorpe High School
Ringgold High School
Performance Learning Center

References

External links

School districts in Georgia (U.S. state)
Education in Catoosa County, Georgia